Zhu Di (born 3 May 1995) is a Chinese footballer who plays for China League Two side Shaanxi Warriors Beyond.

Club career
Zhu Di started his professional football career in 2015 when he was promoted to Henan Jianye's first team squad for the 2015 Chinese Super League campaign. He transferred to fellow Super League side Guangzhou R&F in 2016 and played for their reserve team. Zhu was loaned to Hong Kong Premier League side R&F, which was the satellite team of Guangzhou R&F, in March 2017. He made his senior debut on 5 March 2017 in a 4–0 home loss against Eastern, coming on as a substitute for Yang Ziyi in the 69th minute.

Career statistics 
.

References

External links
Zhu Di at Hkfa.com

1995 births
Living people
Chinese footballers
Footballers from Henan
People from Zhengzhou
Henan Songshan Longmen F.C. players
Guangzhou City F.C. players
R&F (Hong Kong) players
Baoding Yingli Yitong players
Association football midfielders
Chinese Super League players
Hong Kong Premier League players
China League Two players